Bukovica is a rural area of Pljevlja municipality located in northern Montenegro, and is part of the Sandžak region. To the north lay the Bosnian municipalities of Čajniče and Foča.

References

Sources
 

Regions of Montenegro
Populated places in Pljevlja Municipality